Spiramiopsis is a genus of moths in the family Brahmaeidae. It contains the single species Spiramiopsis comma, which is found in South Africa.

References

Endemic moths of South Africa
Brahmaeidae
Moths described in 1901